Chen Longcan (Pinyin: Chén Lóng-càn; born March 21, 1965) is a Chinese table tennis player.

Table tennis career
He won a gold medal in the men's doubles with Wei Qingguang in the 1988 Seoul Olympic Games.

His seven World Championship medals  included three gold medals; one in the doubles with Wei Qingguang at the 1987 World Table Tennis Championships and two in the team event.

Achievements
1985 World Championships - 1st team
1986 World Cup - 1st singles
1987 World Championships - 1st team & doubles (with Wei Qingguang)
1988 Seoul Olympic Games - 1st doubles (with Wei Qingguang)
1989 World Championships - 3rd doubles

He also won an English Open title.

See also
 List of table tennis players
 List of World Table Tennis Championships medalists

References 

http://www.chinadaily.com.cn/olympics/2007-07/29/content_6003639.htm

1965 births
Living people
Chinese male table tennis players
Table tennis players at the 1988 Summer Olympics
Medalists at the 1988 Summer Olympics
Table tennis players from Sichuan
Olympic table tennis players of China
Olympic gold medalists for China
Olympic medalists in table tennis
Asian Games medalists in table tennis
Sportspeople from Chengdu
Table tennis players at the 1986 Asian Games
Table tennis players at the 1990 Asian Games
Medalists at the 1986 Asian Games
Medalists at the 1990 Asian Games
Asian Games silver medalists for China
Asian Games bronze medalists for China